Charles William Strickling (January 3, 1894 – June 14, 1952) was an American attorney, college basketball player and coach, and sports official.

Playing career
Strickling was the team captain of the Virginia basketball team while attending University of Virginia School of Law. In 1915, Strickling helped lead Virginia to an undefeated 17–0 record. Prior to playing basketball at Virginia, he played basketball at Marshall. 

In addition to playing college basketball, Strickling was also a member of Marshall's and Virginia's baseball team.

Coaching and officiating career
Strickling returned to Marshall College as head coach of the men's basketball team. He coached two stints with Marshall in 1923–1924 and 1926–1927.

He served as the head of the West Virginia board of officials.

Legal career
Strickling served as the city attorney of Huntington, West Virginia from 1922 until 1925. He also served as the president of the West Virginia Bar Association until his death in 1952.

Head coaching record

References

1894 births
1952 deaths
20th-century American lawyers
American men's basketball players
Basketball coaches from West Virginia
Basketball players from West Virginia
Centers (basketball)
College men's basketball referees in the United States
Lawyers from Huntington, West Virginia
Marshall Thundering Herd baseball players
Marshall Thundering Herd men's basketball coaches
Marshall Thundering Herd men's basketball players
People from Tyler County, West Virginia
Sportspeople from Huntington, West Virginia
University of Virginia School of Law alumni
Virginia Cavaliers baseball players
Virginia Cavaliers men's basketball players
West Virginia city attorneys